HMS Mersey is a  of the British Royal Navy. Named after the River Mersey, she is the fifth RN vessel to carry the name and the first to be named Mersey in 84 years. Various tenders were renamed Mersey during their service with Mersey Division Royal Naval Reserve (HMS Eaglet) between the early 1950s and late 1970s.

All three were commissioned into service in 2003 to replace the five older s. She was commissioned into the Royal Navy on 28 November 2003. At that time, Mersey was not expected to commence duties until February 2004.

Mersey was the last Royal Navy ship to be launched from Vosper Thornycroft at its Woolston shipyard; Jennie Reeve, wife of Rear-Admiral Jonathon Reeve, Chief of Fleet Support, was the ship's sponsor.

Operational history

For the first thirteen years of operation, Mersey operated around the United Kingdom on Fishery Protection duties.

In May 2012, Mersey became the first command of Sarah Oakley.

In October 2013, Mersey was dry docked in Falmouth.

In January 2016, Mersey became the second River-class OPV to be deployed to the Caribbean Sea following on from her sister Severn in 2015. In May 2016, Mersey was dry docked in Martinique as part of her mid-deployment maintenance period. Mersey returned to Portsmouth on 10 February 2017 after 13 months away to resume her fishery protection duties.

On 3 January 2019, Defence Secretary, Gavin Williamson confirmed that HMS Mersey has been deployed to assist UK and French authorities with illegal migrant crossings in the English Channel.

Future
On 24 April 2017, in a written answer to a question raised by Sir Nicholas Soames, Parliamentary Under-Secretary for Defence Harriett Baldwin stated that Mersey would be decommissioned in 2019.

In March 2018, Baldwin's successor Guto Bebb revealed that £12.7M had been allocated from the EU Exit Preparedness Fund to preserve the three Batch 1 ships, should they be needed to control and enforce UK waters and fisheries following the United Kingdom's withdrawal from the European Union.

On 22 November 2018, Defence Secretary, Gavin Williamson, announced that three Batch 1 River-class ships would be retained in service and forward operated from their affiliated ports. However, the idea of forward basing the Batch 1s was reportedly later abandoned. The ships are now to be retained in service until around 2028.

Affiliations

TS Ardent – Bollington and Macclesfield Sea Cadets
Metropolitan Borough of Sefton, Liverpool.

References

External links

 

River-class patrol vessels
Ships built in Southampton
2003 ships
Ships of the Fishery Protection Squadron of the United Kingdom